Ring Power is a privately held heavy equipment corporation headquartered at the World Commerce Center in St. Johns County, Florida, midway between St. Augustine and Jacksonville.

History
The company was founded in 1961 by L.C. "Ring" Ringhaver, who gave up shrimp boat building to become a Caterpillar engine dealer in St. Augustine, Florida. The following year, they became a full line dealer and relocated to Jacksonville with the North Florida Caterpillar territory. In 1973 the company moved to a  site on U.S. Route 1 (locally known as Philips Highway) and Baymeadows Road on the southside. 

L.C. Ringhaver had two sons, Lance and Randy who worked in the business. When L.C. died in 1976, the sons took over the business. In 1986, the younger son Randy became company president. The older son Lance moved to Tampa and founded the Ringhaver Equipment Company, the Caterpillar dealer for Central Florida. 

On January 1, 2004 Lance announced his retirement, and Ringhaver Equipment Company and Ring Power Corporation merged. 

As the business grew, product lines expanded and more divisions were added. The property in Jacksonville eventually became a complex of seven buildings with 250,000 ft² of space. At the end of the century, they ran out of room to expand, and the character of Philips Highway had changed from industrial to commercial. The decision was made to find a new home with at least . A $1.6 million incentive package was approved by the St. Johns County Commission and Elkins Constructors began work in the Fall of 2003 on a 414,000 ft² facility. Most of their old property along Philips Highway was sold for redevelopment and Ring Power moved to their new headquarters in March, 2005. Lowe's purchased  and built a home improvement store; BJ's Wholesale Club was constructed on an  parcel; a small retail strip center with half a dozen businesses was positioned closest to the intersection of Philips and Baymeadows.

Lance Ringhaver died following an automobile accident in 2016 at the age of 76.

Locations
Ring Power today has twenty-six sales locations.

The port facilities in Jacksonville and Miami allow the company to export equipment almost anywhere in the world. Ring Power has over 1600 employees at branches in 19 cities throughout Florida and offices in California, Georgia, New Jersey, North Carolina, Rhode Island, South Carolina and Texas. Customers can purchase, lease or rent new & used Caterpillar industrial equipment. Ring Power also handles machines made by Kalmar, Linde, Clark, Trail King, Manitowoc, Grove, Gradall, National Crane, Rosco, Gomaco, Phoenix Products and others.

Over 300 employees were assigned to the Ring Power office in Riverview, Florida (near Tampa) in 2006. The operation had outgrown the spartan building constructed in the mid-1980s and needed more space. Instead of razing the structure and building new, they spent nearly $50 million to renovate and created larger offices and common areas, more windows with pleasant views of the landscape, and eliminated scores of the filing cabinets by going paperless.

Divisions

Heavy Equipment Division 
Power Systems Division 
Lift Truck Division
Compressed Air Division 
Ports Division

New Parts Division
Used Parts Division
Service Division 
Government Division 
Tactical Solutions Division

Agricultural Division
Cat Rental Store
Marine Service Center
Export Sales Division
Truck Centers
 
Ring Power Crane - New and used cranes for large projects from six manufacturers.
Entertainment Services - Ring Power can assist with special events such as movie and video filming, corporate events & concerts or parties & shows with an inventory of power equipment including generators, UPS and power distribution; HVAC & lighting; ramps & matting. 
Phoenix Products - manufactures fuel storage tanks, generator enclosures and fuel storage systems, and offers petroleum-recycling services.

Industries
Ring Power supplies equipment used in heavy construction, roadbuilding, logging, agriculture, recycling, waste management and landfill maintenance, governmental, marine power, truck engine power, prime and standby power generation, entertainment venues, industrial power, warehousing, port container handling and material handling.

Current status
The Late-2000s recession caused the construction industry to nearly grind to a halt, which forced the company to reduce their workforce from 2,300 to 1,600. Ring Power was successful in obtaining a government contract to refurbish military vehicles, but business from regular customers was slow.
Now, on the back end of another decade Ring Power has been picking up steam again. They have begun to hire "new to the industry" and "talented veterans of the industry" employees. They have also started many 'training program' positions for salesmen, technicians, and management.

Philanthropy
Ringhaver Park in Jacksonville consists of 576 acres of mostly wetlands. It has 6 soccer fields, 4 softball fields, 2 tennis courts and bleachers & benches; 3 covered picnic shelters with 18 picnic tables; a two-mile (3.2 km) paved trail to a dock for canoe/kayak launching on the Ortega River. It was named for founder Lambert C. Ringhaver, whose family donated funds for park development after his death in 1976. 
 
The $11.6 million, 44,000 ft2 Ringhaver Student Center at Flagler College opened for the 2007-2008 school year. It was built using funds donated by the Ringhaver family.

References

External links
Official website
Caterpillar Inc.
Heavy Equipment Division  
Power Systems Division
Cat Rental Store
Forklift Division
Used Parts Division
Ring Power Crane
Entertainment Services
Phoenix Products Fuel Storage
Compressed Air Division
Parts Division 
Services
Government Division  
Financial Services 
Marine Service Center

Privately held companies based in Florida
Construction equipment rental companies
Companies based in Jacksonville, Florida